Hilarion "Larry" Cuenca Silva (October 21, 1937 – April 27, 2004), also known as Pipoy, was a Filipino comedian, film actor, television personality, boxer and politician. He started as an amateur boxer before being discovered in the show business and appearing in numerous films. Beyond acting and being a prominent comedian, he also ventured into politics, wherein he was elected as a member of the Manila City Council multiple times from 1995 to 2004 and briefly as acting vice mayor in 1998.

Political career
He was elected as a councilor of the 3rd District of Manila in 1995. In 1998, he briefly became vice mayor under Lito Atienza, who ascended to the post of mayor after Alfredo Lim resigned to run for president. That same year, he was reelected as councilor and again in 2001, serving until his death in 2004.

Filmography

Film
Mga Daliring Ginto (1964)
Geron Busabos: Ang Batang Quiapo (1964)
Baril Na Ginto (1964)
Salonga Brothers (1965)
Sa Kamay ng Mga Kilabot (1965)
Black Jack (1965)
Joe Nazareno: Ang Taxi Driver (1965)
Soliman Brothers (1966)
Pistolero (1966)
Wanted: Johnny L (1966)
Master Fighter (1967)
Ang Limbas at ang Lawin (1967)
Sibad (1967)
Room for Rent (1968)
Killer Patrol (1968)
Kapwa Walang Pinapanginoon (1968)
Dugay Na sa Maynila (Tonto Ka Pa) (1968)
The Samurai Fighters (1969)
The Magnificent Ifugao (1969)
Samurai Master (1969)
Pambihirang Tatlo (1969)
Mighty Rock (1969)
3 Patapon (1969)
San Diego (1970)
Dimasalang (1970)
Mandawe (1971)
Bella Bandida (1971)
Putol na Kampilan (1972)
Nardong Putik (1972)
Isla de Toro (1972)
Anak ng Aswang (1973)
Ibilanggo Si... Cavite Boy (1974)
Huli Huli Yan! (1974) - Tenant
Valentin Labrador (1977)
Herkulas (1977)
Gameng (1977)
Roberta (1979)
Siga (1980)
Viva Santiago (1981)
Get My Son Dead or Alive (1982)
Over My Dead Body (1983)
Digmaan, Sa Pagitan ng Langit at Lupa (1983)
Ang Padrino - Hilarion
Sloane (1984) - Motel clerk 
Sarge (1984)
Daddy's Little Darlings (1984)
Nardong Putik (Kilabot ng Cavite) Version II (1984)
The Perils of Gwendoline in the Land of the Yik Yak (1984)
Working Boys (1985) - Bruno Juramentado
Nagalit ang Patay sa Haba ng Lamay (1985)
Mama Said Papa Said I Love You (1985)
Miguel Cordero (1985)
Bomba Arienda (1985)
Iyo ang Tondo, Kanya ang Cavite (1986) - Celso
Isang Kumot Tatlong Unan (1986) - Badong
Alamat ng Ninja Kuno (1986)
Di Bale Na Lang (1987)
Alla ricerca dell'impero sepolto (1987)
Ready!.. Aim!.. Fire!.. (1987) - Lauro Longhair
Leroy Leroy Sinta (1988)
Kambal Tuko (1988) - Boy Kinis
Bobo Cop (1988)
Love Letters ("Eternally" segment; 1988) - Samson
One Day, Isang Araw (1988)
Me & Ninja Liit (1988) - Uto-San
Starzan: Shouting Star of the Jungle (1989)
Killer vs. Ninjas (1989)
Uzi Brothers 9mm (1989)
Gawa Na ang Bala para sa Akin (1989)
Oras-Oras Araw-Araw (1989)
My Pretty Baby (1990)
Hulihin si Nardong Toothpick (1990)
Twist: Ako si Ikaw, Ikaw si Ako (1990) - Henchman 
Pitong Gamol (1991)
Okay Ka, Fairy Ko!: The Movie (1991) - Pipoy
Sam en Miguel: Your Basura, No Problema (1992) - Billy Gin
Okay Ka, Fairy Ko: Part 2 (1992) - Pipoy
Dito sa Pitong Gatang (1992)
Pempe ni Sara at Pen (1992) - Popoy
Junior Police (1993)
Ang Kuya Kong Siga (1993) - Bart
Tunay Na Magkaibigan, Walang Iwanan...Peksman (1994)
Once Upon a Time in Manila (1994) - Chairman Shepherd
Hindi Pa Tapos ang Labada, Darling (1994) - Popoy
Isang Kahig, Tatlong Tuka (1995)
Sa Iyo ang Langit, Akin ang Lupa (1996)
Enteng and the Shaolin Kid (1996) - Gorio
Ang Tange Kong Pag-Ibig (1996) - Tyopips
Lab en Kisses (1996) - Popoy
Tataynic (1998)
Sige, Subukan Mo (1998)
Totoy Guwapo (1999)
Sgt. Isaias Marcos: Bawat Hakbang Panganib (2000)

Television

References

External links
 

1937 births
2004 deaths
20th-century comedians
Burials at the Manila North Cemetery
Filipino actor-politicians
Filipino male comedians
Filipino male film actors
Filipino male television actors
Filipino television personalities
Male actors from Manila
Manila City Council members